How Funny!! (Nepali: हाऊ फन्नी!!) is a 2016 Nepali comedy film, directed by Nilu Doma Sherpa as her feature film debut.  Produced by Malvika Subba for Eyecore Films Nepal and A Tiny But Big Pictures, the film stars Dayahang Rai, Priyanka Karki, Keki Adhikari, Anoop Bikram Shahi and Nisha Adhikari.  After the film's first week of screening in the Kathmandu valley, it was reported to have netted Nrs 30 lakh  during that debut week.

Plot

When Heera (Nisha Adhikari) goes missing and Police Inspector Rai (Dayahang Rai) is having difficulties in discovering her whereabouts. he then hires village girls Pushpa (Priyanka Karki) and Ramita (Keki Adhikari) in hopes he might solve the case with their assistance. The two girls are initially happy with the offer, but have plans of their own.

Cast
 Priyanka Karki as Ramita
 Keki Adhikari as Pushpa
 Dayahang Rai as Inspector Tej Bahadur Rai
 Nisha Adhikari as Heera Samragyee
 Anoop Bikram Shahi
 Sandip Chettri (Special Appearance)

Soundtrack

Production
In September 2014, Tiny But Big Pictures announced their intention to create the film as Nilu Doma Sherpa's first feature film, and filming subsequently took place during December 2014 in Kupondole.

Reception
Online Khabar praised the film and related that director Sherpa made a "remarkable but messy debut".  In a video review, Canada Nepal also praised the film.

References

2010s crime comedy films
2010s mystery films
2016 films
2010s Nepali-language films
Nepalese romantic comedy films
Films shot in Kathmandu
2016 comedy films